Emma Viskic is an Australian novelist and musician.

Biography 
Viskic grew up near the Melbourne suburb of Frankston. Her father is from Dalmatia and her mother is Irish-Australian from Tasmania.

Viskic won the Ned Kelly Award for Best First Fiction in 2016 for Resurrection Bay, and the Davitt Awards for Best Adult Novel, best debut novel and readers' choice in 2016 for Resurrection Bay, as well as the Davitt Award for Best Adult Novel in 2018 for And Fire Came Down.

The Caleb Zelic series has been optioned for television adaptation in the US.

Personal life 
She is married with two grown daughters.

Viskic trained in classical clarinet at the Victorian College of the Arts and the Rotterdam Conservatorium in The Netherlands before working as a chamber musician, including performing with José Carreras and Dame Kiri Te Kanawa.

Bibliography

Caleb Zelic Series 

 Resurrection Bay (2015)
 And Fire Came Down (2017)
 Darkness for Light (2019)
 Those Who Perish (2022)

External links 

 Emma Viskic's website

References 

Year of birth missing (living people)
Living people
Writers from Melbourne
21st-century Australian writers
Victorian College of the Arts alumni
Australian women novelists
Australian people of Croatian descent
Australian people of Irish descent
Australian crime fiction writers